Kenneth Charles Morton Sills (December 5, 1879 – November 15, 1954) was the eighth president of Bowdoin College and the third to be an alumnus.

Life and career
Originally from in Halifax, Nova Scotia, in 1901 Sills graduated summa cum laude from Bowdoin, where he was appointed to Phi Beta Kappa and Delta Kappa Epsilon. He pursued graduate degrees at Columbia University and Harvard University afterwards. 

After working at Columbia for a brief period of time, Sills returned to teach at Bowdoin in 1906, where he soon became dean. After a failed run for the United States Senate as a democrat in 1916, Sills became president of Bowdoin in 1918. He kept determined to keep the school close to its liberal arts curriculum and closed down its Medical School of Maine in 1920. In the early 1930s, Sills was recruited by President Franklin Delano Roosevelt to commission a study on how the Bay of Fundy tides could harness electrical power and, from 1939 to 1941, he served as chairman of the board for the Carnegie Foundation for the Advancement of Teaching. After World War II, he served on the board of trustees of the World Peace Foundation. Sills served an unusually long term as president, finally resigning in 1952, widely regarded as one of the most prominent and amiable college presidents in Bowdoin's over 200-year history. Nevertheless, a published poet, he is perhaps best known today for having written the school's Alma Mater, "Rise, Sons of Bowdoin" which continues to be sung today more than fifty years after it was originally written.

Published works
 The First American and Other Poems

References

Further reading

1879 births
1954 deaths
Columbia University alumni
Harvard University alumni
Presidents of Bowdoin College
Bowdoin College alumni
People from Halifax, Nova Scotia